Anastasia Gennadievna Zagoruiko (born 15 October 1988) is a Russian biathlete. She competes in the Biathlon World Cup, and represents Russia at the Biathlon World Championships 2016.

References

1988 births
Living people
Russian female biathletes
People from Tyumen Oblast
Universiade silver medalists for Russia
Universiade medalists in biathlon
Competitors at the 2011 Winter Universiade
Sportspeople from Tyumen Oblast